Nebria rubrofemorata is a species of ground beetle in the Nebriinae subfamily that is endemic to Altai.

References

rubrofemorata
Beetles described in 1975
Beetles of Asia
Endemic fauna of Altai